The 2017 Summit League women's soccer tournament was the postseason women's soccer tournament for the Summit League held on November 2 and 4, 2017. The three-match tournament took place at Dacotah Field in Fargo, North Dakota. The four-team single-elimination tournament consisted of two rounds based on seeding from regular season conference play. The South Dakota State Jackrabbits were the defending champions, but they were eliminated from the 2017 tournament with a 2–0 semifinal loss to the North Dakota State Bison. The Denver Pioneers won the tournament and earned the conference's automatic bid to the NCAA tournament. The tournament win was Denver's second as a member of the conference.

Bracket

Schedule

Semifinals

Final

Statistics

Goalscorers 

2 Goals
 Jessie Dancy - Denver

1 Goal
 Britney Monteon - North Dakota State
 Malley O'Brien - North Dakota State
 Angelica Pacheco - Denver
 Roxy Roemer - North Dakota State

See also 
 Summit League
 2017 NCAA Division I women's soccer season
 2017 NCAA Division I Women's Soccer Tournament
 2017 Summit League Men's Soccer Tournament

References

External links 

Summit League Women's Soccer Tournament
2017 Summit League women's soccer season